Ed Blum is the director and producer of Scenes of a Sexual Nature (2006), a low budget British movie starring Ewan McGregor and Sophie Okonedo, filmed entirely on Hampstead Heath. This was his first full-length feature and as Blum said, was made "for less than Love Actually 's catering budget."

He was educated at The King's School, Ely.

References

External links
 

Living people
British film directors
British film producers
Place of birth missing (living people)
People educated at King's Ely
Year of birth missing (living people)